Barbara Gray is the General Manager of Transportation Services at the City of Toronto and an Advisory Board Member of the University of Toronto Transportation Research Institute. She is an expert in urban transportation and urban transit.  Gray has been working as a municipal civil servant since 1999, first in Seattle, and, since 2016, in Toronto.

Early life 
Gray was born in Manhattan, before moving to New Jersey. She attended Lafayette College in Pennsylvania before moving to Seattle Washington to earn a graduate degree in Urban Planning at the University of Washington.

Seattle Department of Transportation 
Ben Spurr, writing in the Toronto Star, described Gray as an advocate of "Progressive transportation policies".  He reported she was a defender of the rights of pedestrians and cyclists.  Spurr wrote that Gray played a central role in getting the Seattle electorate to vote to support the Move Seattle levy, an additional tax Seattle taxpayers would pay to build improvements to Seattle public transportation infrastructure.

Toronto Transportation Services 
Sue-Ann Levy, writing in the Toronto Sun, asserted that Gray was engaged in a "war on the car", in both Seattle and Toronto.

In May 2017, CBC News reported that Gray had announced the retirement of four senior subordinates.

IT Business magazine interviewed Gray in December 2017 about two traffic light systems, that relied on artificial intelligence, that Toronto was experimenting with.  Toronto's current system uses car-sensing inductance loops, and fixed algorithms, to detect and modify light timing.

References

1966 births
People from Manhattan
University of Washington College of Built Environments alumni
People from Toronto
People from Seattle
Living people
American urban planners